Mruczkowski (feminine: Mruczkowska, plural: Mruczkowscy) is a surname of Polish language origin. It may refer to:

People
 Gene Mruczkowski (born 1980), NFL American football guard
 Scott Mruczkowski (born April 5, 1982), NFL American football center
 Tomasz Mruczkowski (born June 3, 1966), Polish olympic rower
 Waldemar Mruczkowski (February 26, 1920 – February 20, 2006), pseudonym of Lucjan Wolanowski, Polish journalist, writer and traveller

See also
 
 
Mroczkowski

Polish-language surnames